The 2002–03 NBA season was the 57th season for the Boston Celtics in the National Basketball Association. During the off-season, the Celtics acquired Vin Baker and Shammond Williams from the Seattle SuperSonics, and signed free agent and undrafted rookie J.R. Bremer. The Celtics posted a six-game winning streak after losing their first two games, and got off to a solid 16–7 start, holding a 27–22 record at the All-Star break. At midseason, Williams was traded to the Denver Nuggets in exchange for former Celtics center Mark Blount. However, the Celtics lost six straight games in March, and finished third in the Atlantic Division with a 44–38 record. The team made the playoffs for the second time with team captain Paul Pierce, but this time as the #6 seed in the Eastern Conference.

Pierce averaged 25.9 points, 7.3 rebounds, 4.4, assists and 1.8 steals per game, and was named to the All-NBA Third Team, while Antoine Walker averaged 20.1 points, 7.2 rebounds, 4.8 assists and 1.5 steals per game. Pierce and Walker were both selected for the 2003 NBA All-Star Game. In addition, Tony Delk contributed 9.8 points per game, while Eric Williams provided the team with 9.1 points and 4.7 rebounds per game,  Bremer contributed 8.3 points per game and was selected to the NBA All-Rookie Second Team, and Tony Battie provided with 7.3 points and 6.5 rebounds per game.

After defeating the 3rd-seeded Indiana Pacers four games to two in the Eastern Conference First Round, the Celtics were unable to stop the New Jersey Nets as they were swept in four straight Eastern Conference Semi-final games. The Nets would reach the Finals for the second consecutive year, but would lose in six games to the San Antonio Spurs. This was also Walker's final season with the Celtics, as he was traded along with Delk to the Dallas Mavericks the following offseason. He would return to Boston midway during the 2004–05 season. Also following the season, Bremer was traded to the Cleveland Cavaliers.

The franchise gained new owners that season when Paul Gaston sold the team to the Boston Basketball Partners, represented by Wyc Grousbeck, in the fall of 2002.

Draft picks

Roster

Regular season

Standings

Record vs. opponents

Game log

|- align="center" bgcolor="edbebf"
| 1 || October 30 || Chicago Bulls  ||L 96-99 || FleetCenter  || 0-1 
|- align="center" bgcolor="edbebf" 
| 2 || October 31 || @ Washington Wizards  ||L 69-114  || MCI Center || 0-2 
|-

|- align="center" bgcolor="#bbffbb" 
| 3 || November 2 || @ New York Knicks ||W 117-107 || Madison Square Garden || 1-2
|- align="center" bgcolor="#bbffbb"
| 4 || November 6 || @ Chicago Bulls ||W 91-69 || United Center || 2-2 
|- align="center" bgcolor="#bbffbb"
| 5 || November 7 || Los Angeles Lakers ||W 98-95 (OT) || FleetCenter || 3-2 
|- align="center" bgcolor="#bbffbb" 
| 6 || November 9 || @ Minnesota Timberwolves ||W 105-99 || Target Center || 4-2 
|- align="center" bgcolor="#bbffbb" 
| 7 || November 11 || Utah Jazz ||W 112-95 || FleetCenter ||5-2 
|- align="center" bgcolor="#bbffbb"
| 8 || November 13 || Philadelphia 76ers ||W 91-81 || FleetCenter || 6-2
|- align="center" bgcolor="edbebf" 
| 9 || November 15 || Dallas Mavericks ||L 86-97 || FleetCenter || 6-3 
|- align="center" bgcolor="edbebf"
| 10 || November 16 || @ Milwaukee Bucks ||L 85-104 || Bradley Center || 6-4
|- align="center" bgcolor="#bbffbb" 
| 11 || November 20 || New Jersey Nets ||W 96-79 || FleetCenter || 7-4
|- align="center" bgcolor="#bbffbb"
| 12 || November 22 || Atlanta Hawks ||W 105-98 (20T) || FleetCenter || 8-4
|- align="center" bgcolor="#bbffbb" 
| 13 || November 23 || @ Atlanta Hawks ||W 109-99 || Philips Arena || 9-4
|- align="center" bgcolor="#bbffbb" 
| 14 || November 27 || Chicago Bulls ||W 92-82 || FleetCenter || 10-4
|- align="center" bgcolor="edbebf"
| 15 || November 29 || Toronto Raptors  ||L 95-98 || FleetCenter || 10-5
|-

|- align="center" bgcolor="#bbffbb" 
| 16 || December 1 || New Orleans Hornets ||W 95-86 || FleetCenter || 11-5
|- align="center" bgcolor="#bbffbb" 
| 17 || December 2 || @ Orlando Magic  ||W 102-97 || TD Waterhouse Centre || 12-5
|- align="center" bgcolor="edbebf"
| 18 || December 4 || @ Philadelphia 76ers ||L 93-99 || First Union Center || 12-6
|- align="center" bgcolor="#bbffbb"  
| 19 || December 6 || New York Knicks ||W 91-80 || FleetCenter || 13-6
|- align="center" bgcolor="#bbffbb"
| 20 || December 9 || Orlando Magic  ||W 114-109 (OT) || FleetCenter || 14-6
|- align="center" bgcolor="edbebf"
| 21 || December 11 || Phoenix Suns ||L 94-103 || FleetCenter || 14-7
|- align="center" bgcolor="#bbffbb"
| 22 || December 13 || Cleveland Cavaliers ||W 115-100 || FleetCenter || 15-7
|- align="center" bgcolor="#bbffbb"
| 23 || December 14 || @ New York Knicks ||W 113-90 || Madison Square Garden || 16-7
|- align="center" bgcolor="edbebf" 
| 24 || December 16 || @ Chicago Bulls ||L 92-98 || United Center || 16-8
|- align="center" bgcolor="edbebf" 
| 25 || December 18 || Miami Heat ||L 81-91 || FleetCenter || 16-9
|- align="center" bgcolor="#bbffbb"
| 26 || December 20 || Minnesota Timberwolves ||W 108-99 || FleetCenter || 17-9
|- align="center" bgcolor="#bbffbb"
| 27 || December 21 || @ Cleveland Cavaliers ||W 89-82 || Gund Arena || 18-9
|- align="center" bgcolor="edbebf" 
| 28 || December 25 || @ New Jersey Nets ||L 81-117 || Continental Airlines Arena || 18-10
|- align="center" bgcolor="edbebf"
| 29 || December 27 || @ Miami Heat ||L 70-90 || American Airlines Arena || 18-11
|- align="center" bgcolor="edbebf"
| 30 || December 28  || @ Orlando Magic ||L 95-101 || TD Waterhouse Centre || 18-12
|- align="center" bgcolor="#bbffbb"
| 31 || December 31  || Memphis Grizzlies ||W 96-89 || FleetCenter || 19-12
|-

|- align="center" bgcolor="edbebf"
| 32 || January 3 || Portland Trail Blazers ||L 103-108 || FleetCenter || 19-13
|- align="center" bgcolor="edbebf"
| 33 || January 6 || Washington Wizards ||L 95-100 || FleetCenter || 19-14
|- align="center" bgcolor="#bbffbb" 
| 34 || January 8 || @ New Orleans Hornets ||W 93-83 || New Orleans Arena || 20-14
|- align="center" bgcolor="edbebf" 
| 35 || January 10 || @ Dallas Mavericks ||L 78-103 || American Airlines Center || 20-15
|- align="center" bgcolor="edbebf"
| 36 || January 12  || @ San Antonio Spurs ||L 80-81 || SBC Center || 20-16
|- align="center" bgcolor="edbebf"
| 37 || January 13 || @ Houston Rockets ||L 92-101 || Compaq Center || 20-17
|- align="center" bgcolor="#bbffbb" 
| 38 || January 15 || Atlanta Hawks ||W 86-66 || FleetCenter || 21-17
|- align="center" bgcolor="#bbffbb" 
| 39 || January 17 || Indiana Pacers ||W 98-93 || FleetCenter || 22-17
|- align="center" bgcolor="#bbffbb"
| 40 || January 18 || @ Milwaukee Bucks ||W 97-95 || Bradley Center || 23-17
|- align="center" bgcolor="#bbffbb"
| 41 || January 20  || @ Philadelphia 76ers ||W 100-99 || First Union Center || 24-17
|- align="center" bgcolor="edbebf"
| 42 || January 22 || Milwaukee Bucks ||L 97-106 || FleetCenter || 24-18
|- align="center" bgcolor="#bbffbb" 
| 43 || January 24 || Denver Nuggets ||W 77-58 || FleetCenter || 25-18
|- align="center" bgcolor="#bbffbb" 
| 44 || January 26 || Orlando Magic ||W 91-83 || FleetCenter || 26-18
|- align="center" bgcolor="edbebf" 
| 45 || January 28 || @ Detroit Pistons ||L 83-86 || The Palace of Auburn Hills || 26-19
|- align="center" bgcolor="edbebf" 
| 46 || January 31 || Detroit Pistons ||L 66-118 || FleetCenter || 26-20
|-

|- align="center" bgcolor="edbebf"
| 47 || February 1 || @ Indiana Pacers ||l 100-109 || Conseco Fieldhouse || 26-21
|- align="center" bgcolor="edbebf" 
| 48 || February 3 || @ New Orleans Hornets ||L 96-103 || New Orleans Arena || 26-22
|- align="center" bgcolor="#bbffbb"
| 49 || February 5 || Seattle SuperSonics ||W 114-74 || FleetCenter || 27-22
|- align="center" bgcolor="#bbffbb"  
| 50 || February 11 || @ Seattle SuperSonics ||W 82-76 || KeyArena at Seattle Center || 28-22
|- align="center" bgcolor="#bbffbb"  
| 51 || February 13 || @ Portland Trail Blazers ||W 100-92 || Rose Garden || 29-22 
|- align="center" bgcolor="#bbffbb" 
| 52 || February 15 || @ Los Angeles Clippers ||W 92-84 || Staples Center || 30-22
|- align="center" bgcolor="edbebf" 
| 53 || February 16 || @ Phoenix Suns ||L 92-102 || America West Arena || 30-23
|- align="center" bgcolor="#bbffbb"
| 54 || February 18 || @ Golden State Warriors ||W 125-117 || The Arena in Oakland || 31-23
|- align="center" bgcolor="edbebf"
| 55 || February 20 || @ Sacramento Kings ||L 83-105 || ARCO Arena || 31-24
|- align="center" bgcolor="edbebf"
| 56 || February 24 || Houston Rockets ||L 95-101 (OT) || FleetCenter || 31-25
|- align="center" bgcolor="#bbffbb"
| 57 || February 26 || Indiana Pacers ||W 71-69 || FleetCenter || 32-25
|- align="center" bgcolor="#bbffbb"
| 58 || February 28 || Toronto Raptors ||W 90-85 || FleetCenter || 33-25
|-

|- align="center" bgcolor="edbebf" 
| 59  || March 2 || @ Toronto Raptors ||L 92-104 || Air Canada Centre || 33-26
|- align="center" bgcolor="#bbffbb" 
| 60  || March 3 || @ Memphis Grizzlies ||W 111-110 || The Pyramid || 34-26
|- align="center" bgcolor="#bbffbb"
| 61  || March 5 || New York Knicks ||W 97-95 || FleetCenter || 35-26
|- align="center" bgcolor="#bbffbb"
| 62  || March 7 || Los Angeles Clippers ||W 83-72 || FleetCenter || 36-26
|- align="center" bgcolor="edbebf" 
| 63  || March 9 || San Antonio Spurs ||L 78-94 || FleetCenter || 36-27
|- align="center" bgcolor="#bbffbb"
| 64  || March 12 || New Orleans Hornets ||W 93-65 || FleetCenter || 37-27
|- align="center" bgcolor="edbebf" 
| 65  || March 13 || @ New Jersey Nets ||L 75-90 || Continental Airlines Arena || 37-28
|- align="center" bgcolor="#bbffbb"
| 66  || March 15 || @ Detroit Pistons ||W 81-71 || The Palace of Auburn Hills || 38-28
|- align="center" bgcolor="edbebf" 
| 67  || March 18 || New Jersey Nets ||L 74-87 || FleetCenter || 38-29
|- align="center" bgcolor="edbebf" 
| 68  || March 19 || @ Indiana Pacers ||L 72-102 || Conseco Fieldhouse || 38-30
|- align="center" bgcolor="edbebf"
| 69  || March 21 || @ Los Angeles Lakers ||L 96-104 || Staples Center || 38-31
|- align="center" bgcolor="edbebf" 
| 70  || March 22 || @ Denver Nuggets ||L 80-90 || Pepsi Center || 38-32
|- align="center" bgcolor="edbebf" 
| 71  || March 24 || @ Utah Jazz ||L 91-96 || Delta Center || 38-33
|- align="center" bgcolor="edbebf" 
| 72  || March 26 || Golden State Warriors ||L 95-107 || FleetCenter || 38-34
|- align="center" bgcolor="#bbffbb"
| 73  || March 28 || Cleveland Cavaliers ||W 104-95 || FleetCenter || 39-34
|- align="center" bgcolor="#bbffbb" 
| 74  || March 29 || @ Cleveland Cavaliers ||W 110-106 || FleetCenter || 40-34
|-

|- align="center" bgcolor="#bbffbb"
| 75  || April 2 || Miami Heat ||W 90-62 || FleetCenter || 41-34
|- align="center" bgcolor="edbebf"
| 76  || April 4 || Sacramento Kings ||L 92-93 || FleetCenter || 41-35
|- align="center" bgcolor="edbebf" 
| 77  || April 6 || Washington Wizards ||L 98-99 (OT) || FleetCenter || 41-36
|- align="center" bgcolor="#bbffbb"
| 78  || April 9 || @ Washington Wizards ||W 87-83 || MCI Center || 42-36
|- align="center" bgcolor="edbebf"  
| 79  || April 10 || Philadelphia 76ers ||L 78-99 || FleetCenter || 42-37
|- align="center" bgcolor="edbebf" 
| 80  || April 12 || @ Orlando Magic ||L 86-89 || TD Waterhouse Centre || 42-38
|- align="center" bgcolor="#bbffbb"
| 81  || April 13 || @ Miami Heat ||W 94-86 || American Airlines Arena || 43-38
|- align="center" bgcolor="#bbffbb"
| 82  || April 16 || Detroit Pistons ||W 99-92 || FleetCenter || 44-38
|-

|-
| 2002-03 Schedule

Playoffs

|- align="center" bgcolor="#ccffcc"
| 1
| April 19
| @ Indiana
| W 103–100
| Paul Pierce (40)
| Paul Pierce (11)
| Paul Pierce (6)
| Conseco Fieldhouse16,380
| 1–0
|- align="center" bgcolor="#ffcccc"
| 2
| April 21
| @ Indiana
| L 77–89
| Antoine Walker (19)
| Tony Battie (11)
| Paul Pierce (6)
| Conseco Fieldhouse15,881
| 1–1
|- align="center" bgcolor="#ccffcc"
| 3
| April 24
| Indiana
| W 101–83
| Paul Pierce (21)
| Paul Pierce (12)
| Walter McCarty (6)
| FleetCenter18,624
| 2–1
|- align="center" bgcolor="#ccffcc"
| 4 
| April 27
| Indiana
| W 102–92
| Paul Pierce (37)
| Antoine Walker (11)
| Paul Pierce (7)
| FleetCenter18,624
| 3–1
|- align="center" bgcolor="#ffcccc"
| 5
| April 29
| @ Indiana
| L 88–93 (OT)
| Antoine Walker (21)
| Eric Williams (8)
| Paul Pierce (8)
| Conseco Fieldhouse15,326
| 3–2
|- align="center" bgcolor="#ccffcc"
| 6
| May 1
| Indiana
| W 110–90
| Paul Pierce (27)
| Pierce, Williams (8)
| Antoine Walker (5)
| FleetCenter18,624
| 4–2
|-

|- align="center" bgcolor="#ffcccc"
| 1
| May 5
| @ New Jersey
| L 93–97
| Paul Pierce (34)
| Antoine Walker (8)
| Paul Pierce (8)
| Continental Airlines Arena17,343
| 0–1
|- align="center" bgcolor="#ffcccc"
| 2
| May 7
| @ New Jersey
| L 95–104
| Paul Pierce (32)
| Paul Pierce (10)
| Paul Pierce (11)
| Continental Airlines Arena19,934
| 0–2
|- align="center" bgcolor="#ffcccc"
| 3
| May 9
| New Jersey
| L 76–94
| Paul Pierce (23)
| Antoine Walker (15)
| Tony Delk (6)
| FleetCenter18,624
| 0–3
|- align="center" bgcolor="#ffcccc"
| 4
| May 12
| New Jersey
| L 101–110 (2OT)
| Paul Pierce (27)
| Paul Pierce (10)
| Pierce, Walker (7)
| FleetCenter18,624
| 0–4
|-

See also
Reebok Pro Summer League, a summer league hosted by the Celtics

References

Boston Celtics seasons
Boston Celtics
Boston Celtics
Boston Celtics
Celtics
Celtics